The 43rd Cuban National Series ended with Industriales winning their record 10th title, sweeping Villa Clara in the best of seven final.

Regular season standings

Western zone

Eastern zone

Playoffs

References
 passim

Cuban National Series seasons
Base
Base
Cuba